Sir John Joseph Swaine,  (Traditional Chinese: 施偉賢爵士, 22 April 1932 – 7 August 2012) was the President of the Legislative Council of Hong Kong from 1993 to 1995. A barrister by training, Swaine was an appointed and unofficial member of the council. Before 1993, the President was the Governor of Hong Kong.

Career 
He was the Deputy President of the Council between 1991 and 1993, when the Governor refrained from presiding over the Council meetings. The post was abolished with the election of the President of the council from amongst the councillors (thus replacing the Governor).

After his work at the Legco, Swaine returned to the private practice of law.

The Swaine family (John Joseph, his son John Joseph Edward, and Jason Mark) owns Intergood Limited. John Joseph Edward Swaine is also a barrister and CEO of the Media Bank. His son John L. Swaine is a law student in England.

Swaine was appointed a Queen's Counsel in 1975, an Officer of the Order of the British Empire in 1980 and a Commander of the Order of the British Empire in 1987. He was knighted by Queen Elizabeth II in 1995. He died in Malta on 7 August 2012 while on holiday.

References
 Burkes Peerage entry 
 CE saddened by death of Sir John J Swaine

Members of the Executive Council of Hong Kong
Solicitors of Hong Kong 
Commanders of the Order of the British Empire
Alumni of the University of Hong Kong
Hong Kong Senior Counsel
Knights Bachelor
Lawyers awarded knighthoods
1932 births
2012 deaths
HK LegCo Members 1985–1988
HK LegCo Members 1991–1995
Hong Kong Queen's Counsel

Presidents of the Legislative Council of Hong Kong